The Street Album is the third studio album by American rapper The Jacka. It includes guest appearances from Keak da Sneak, Messy Marv, The Federation & Dem Hoodstarz, amongst other artists. The Street Album peaked at #80 on the R&B/Hip-Hop Albums chart.

Music videos have been filmed for the songs "Wit the S**t" featuring J-Diggs & Joe Blow, "Aspen", "All Over Me" featuring Dem Hoodstarz, Messy Marv, Keak da Sneak & Fed-X and "F**k Everybody".

Critical response
In a mixed review, XXL editor The Infamous O stated "In a lot of ways the kid, Jacka, is reminiscent of a young 50 Cent with his choice in production and sound. The same way 50 used the mixtape to showcase his ability to create music over all kinds of sounds and samples, Jacka uses The Street Album to demonstrate that his potential goes beyond head knocking hip-hop like most upcoming MCs. But his true self lies in the street cuts where he speaks with such grunts that sometimes it’s hard to make out what he’s saying. It sounds like it rhymes, but only he and his true followers know for sure."

Track listing

References

2008 albums
The Jacka albums